Forcella Staulanza (el. 1766 m.) is a high mountain pass in the Dolomites in the province of Belluno in Italy.

It connects the Zoldo valley in the south and the Fiorentina valley in the north.

See also
 List of highest paved roads in Europe
 List of mountain passes

Staulanza